Odontolabis dalmani is a species of beetles belonging to the family Lucanidae.

Description
The basic colour is dark brown, with a fine pubescence. The large mandible of males are used to wrestle each other for mating or food. These beetles are nocturnal. Adults feed on tree sap and decaying fruits. The life cycle lasts about 22 – 26 months.

Distribution
This species can be found in Tenasserim Island, Malayan Peninsula, Borneo, Sumatra and Java.

Etymology
The species is named to honour the Swedish entomologist Johan Wilhelm Dalman.

References
 Biolib
 Universal Biological Indexer
 Hallan, Joel -  Synopsis of the described Coleoptera of the World
 World Field Guide

dalmani
Beetles described in 1845
Arthropods of Borneo